East Gaffney is a census-designated place (CDP) in Cherokee County, South Carolina, United States. The population was 3,085 at the 2010 United States Census.

Geography
East Gaffney is located in central Cherokee County at  (35.083060, -81.628302), on the eastern border of the city of Gaffney, the county seat. U.S. Route 29 is the main road through the community, leading west into Gaffney and northeast  to Blacksburg. Interstate 85 passes north of the community, with access from Exit 95.

Demographics

As of the census of 2000, there were 3,349 people, 1,380 households, and 916 families residing in the CDP. The population density was 1,058.0 people per square mile (407.9/km2). There were 1,563 housing units at an average density of 493.8/sq mi (190.4/km2). The racial makeup of the CDP was 77.64% White, 20.39% African American, 0.09% Native American, 0.33% Asian, 0.03% Pacific Islander, 0.87% from other races, and 0.66% from two or more races. Hispanic or Latino of any race were 2.57% of the population.

There were 1,380 households, out of which 28.3% had children under the age of 18 living with them, 41.9% were married couples living together, 18.8% had a female householder with no husband present, and 33.6% were non-families. 27.8% of all households were made up of individuals, and 9.3% had someone living alone who was 65 years of age or older. The average household size was 2.42 and the average family size was 2.96.

In the CDP, the population was spread out, with 24.7% under the age of 18, 9.1% from 18 to 24, 29.3% from 25 to 44, 23.3% from 45 to 64, and 13.6% who were 65 years of age or older. The median age was 36 years. For every 100 females, there were 96.3 males. For every 100 females age 18 and over, there were 91.3 males.

The median income for a household in the CDP was $24,527, and the median income for a family was $32,167. Males had a median income of $26,156 versus $21,009 for females. The per capita income for the CDP was $12,902. About 16.0% of families and 22.6% of the population were below the poverty line, including 28.5% of those under age 18 and 13.0% of those age 65 or over.

References

Census-designated places in South Carolina